The 1954 Oklahoma gubernatorial election was held on November 2, 1954, and was a race for Governor of Oklahoma. Democrat  Raymond Gary defeated Republican Reuben K. Sparks.

Results

References

1954
Gubernatorial
Okla